This is a list of notable video game companies that have made games for either computers (like PC or Mac), video game consoles, handheld or mobile devices, and includes companies that currently exist as well as now-defunct companies.

See the list of video games for other lists relating to video games, and defunct video game companies for a more specific list of companies that no longer exist. Many of the developers publish their own games.

List of notable developers

See also 
 List of indie game developers

References

Lists of companies by industry

Developers